The Creighton process involves the hydrogenation of a 6 carbon chain aldehyde.  The reactant is 2,3,4,5,6-pentahydroxyhexanal (an aldehyde) and the product is 1,2,3,4,5,6-hexanehexol (an alcohol). The product thus has two more hydrogen atoms than the reactant: -CHO is replaced by -CH2OH.

The Creighton process was patented in the 1920s.

References

Name reactions